William or Bill Sweeney may refer to:

Bill Sweeney (first baseman) (1904–1957), baseball player
Bill Sweeney (footballer) (1914–1973), Australian footballer
Bill Sweeney (ice hockey) (1937–1991), Canadian ice hockey player
Bill Sweeney (infielder) (1886–1948), American baseball player
Bill Sweeney (pitcher) (1858–1903), baseball player
Bill Sweeney (CEO), CEO of the International Foundation for Electoral Systems
William Sweeney (composer) (born 1950), Scottish composer
William J. Sweeney (Wisconsin politician), American politician
William N. Sweeney (1832–1895), American politician
William Sweeney (Medal of Honor) (1856–?), U.S. Navy sailor and Medal of Honor recipient
W. Allison Sweeney (1851–1921), American newspaper writer, editor, and owner

See also
A. William Sweeney (1920–2003), soldier, lawyer and judge from Ohio